Songs written, co-written and produced by Linda Perry.

1992

4 Non Blondes - Bigger, Better, Faster, More!
 01. Train
 02. Superfly
 03. What's Up?
 04. Pleasantly Blue
 06. Spaceman
 07. Old Mr. Heffer
 08. Calling All The People
 09. Dear Mr. President
 10. Drifting
 11. No Place Like Home

Tracks 1, 3, 4, 9 & 10 written by Linda Perry Track 2 written by Linda Perry & Katrina Sirdofsky Track 6 written by Linda Perry & Shaunna Hall Tracks 7 & 11 written by Linda Perry, Shaunna Hall, Christa Hillhouse & Wanda Day Track 8 written by Linda Perry, Shaunna Hall, Christa Hillhouse, Wanda Day & Dawn Richardson

1993

4 Non Blondes - Spaceman - Single
 02. Strange
Written by Linda Perry & Roger Rocha

1995

Janis Ian - Revenge
 08. Berlin
Written by Linda Perry & Janis Ian in middle of 1995

1996

Stone Fox - Stone Fox
 01. Jarvina [Jarvina Cherry]
 02. Lamby's Legs
 03. Two Solid Weeks Of Menstruation
 04. Shakey Egg
 05. Untitled [Hidden Track]
 06. Sandwich King
 07. Poach
 08. Puppet
 09. Innerds
 10. Untitled [Hidden Track]
 11. Tiny Box Of Lies
 12. Coke Whore
 13. HIV+
 14. The Smiths [Hidden Track]
Tracks 1, 2, 3, 4, 6, 8, 9, 11 & 12 mixed by Linda Perry & Devon Powers

All tracks produced by Linda Perry

Linda Perry - In Flight
 01. In My Dreams
 02. Freeway
 03. Uninvited
 04. Success
 05. Life In A Bottle
 06. Fill Me Up
 07. Knock Me Out (featuring Grace Slick)
 08. Too Deep
 09. Taken
 10. Fruitloop Daydream
 11. Machine Man
 12. In Flight
Tracks 1, 2, 3, 5, 6, 8, 9 & 12 written by Linda Perry Track 4 written by Linda Perry & Bill Bottrell Track 7 written by Linda Perry, Marty Wilson Piper & Grace Slick Track 10 written by Linda Perry, Bill Bottrell, Brian MacLeod, Kevin Gilbert & Dan Schwartz Track 11 written by Linda Perry, Brian MacLeod, Kevin Gilbert & Dan Schwartz
All tracks co-produced by Linda Perry

Linda Perry - Fill Me Up - Single
 04. Shame (Unreleased)
Written by Linda Perry & Bill Botrell
Co-produced by Linda Perry

Linda Perry - Freeway - Single
 04. Blow
Written by Linda Perry
Produced by Linda Perry & Bill Bottrell

1998

The Waiting - Unfazed
 05. I Need You
 07. So Much Of Me
Written by Brad Olsen, Linda Perry, Brian MacLeod, Paul Ill & Eric Schermerhorn in 1998

1999

Linda Perry - After Hours
 01. The Garden
 02. Jackie
 03. Sunny April Afternoon
 04. Lost Command
 05. Get It While You Can
 06. Bang The Drum
 07. Some Days Never End
 08. New Dawn
 09. Fly Away
 10. Let Me Ride
 11. The Cows Come Home
 12. Carry On
Tracks 1, 2, 3, 5, 6, 7, 8, 10 and 12 written by Linda Perry
Tracks 4 & 11 written by Linda Perry, Brian MacLeod & Paul Ill
Track 9 written by Linda Perry, D.C. Collard & Paul Ill
Produced by Bob Salcedo & Linda Perry

2001

Pink - Missundaztood
 01. Missundaztood
 04. Get The Party Started
 05. Respect (featuring Scratch)
 09. Dear Diary
 10. Eventually
 11. Lonely Girl (featuring Linda Perry)
 13. Gone To California
 14. My Vietnam
 15. Catch-22 [non-US bonus track]
Tracks 1, 5, 9, 10, 13, 14 & 15 written by Pink & Linda Perry
Tracks 4 & 11 written by Linda Perry
Tracks 1, 5, 13, 14 & 15 produced by Linda Perry & Damon Elliott
Tracks 4, 9, 10 & 11 produced by Linda Perry

2002

Various Artists - Sweet Home Alabama (OST)
 01. Jewel - Sweet Home Alabama
Produced by Linda Perry

Faith Hill - Cry
 08. If You're Gonna Fly Away
Written by Linda Perry & Pink

Christina Aguilera - Stripped
 11. Beautiful
 12. Make Over
 13. Cruz
 19. I'm OK
Track 11 written by Linda Perry
Track 12, 13 & 19 written by Christina Aguilera & Linda Perry
Produced by Linda Perry

Make Over written by Linda Perry, Christina Aguilera, Jonathan Lipsey, Felix Howard, Cameron McVey & Paul Simm (ASCAP, 2003)

Solange - Solo Star
 09. Wonderland
Written by Linda Perry, Solange Knowles & Rockwilder in middle of 2002

2003

Lillix - Falling Uphill
 01. Tomorrow
Written by Linda Perry, Louise Burns, Tasha-Ray Evin & Lacey-Lee Evin
Produced by Linda Perry

Various Artists - Prey For Rock & Roll (OST)
 03. Gina Gershon, Linda Perry & Patty Schemel - Stupid Star
Written by Gina Gershon & Linda Perry
Original Score composed by Gina Gershon, Cheri Lovedog & Linda Perry

Sugababes - Three
 10. Nasty Ghetto
Written by Linda Perry, Keisha Buchanan, Mutya Buena & Heidi Range 
Produced by Linda Perry

Pink - Try This
 06. Catch Me While I'm Sleeping
 07. Waiting For Love
 09. Try Too Hard
Tracks 6 & 9 written by Pink & Linda Perry
Track 7 written by Pink, Linda Perry, Eric Schermerhorn, Paul Ill & Brian MaCleod
Produced by Linda Perry

Japanese edition
 14. Delirium
 15. Free
Track 14 written by Pink & Linda Perry
Track 15 written by Pink, Linda Perry, Eric Schermerhorn, Paul Ill & Brian MacLeod
Produced by Linda Perry

Blaque - Torch
 05. It's Not Me
 13. Love 'Em Down
Written by Linda Perry, Natina Reed, Shamari Fears & Brandi Williams
Produced by Linda Perry

Never officially released

2004

Courtney Love - America's Sweetheart
 01. Mono
 04. Sunset Strip
 05. All The Drugs
 07. I'll Do Anything
 08. Uncool
 09. Life Despite God
 10. Hello
 11. Zeplin Song
 12. Never Gonna Be The Same
Track 1 written by Courtney Love, Linda Perry, Patty Schemel & Larry Schemel
Tracks 4, 7, 9, 10 & 12 written by Courtney Love, Linda Perry, Patty Schemel & Jerry Best
Track 5 written by Courtney Love, Linda Perry, Patty Schemel, Jerry Best & Chris Whitemeyer
Track 8 written by Courtney Love, Linda Perry, Bernie Taupin, Patty Schemel & Jerry Best
Track 11 written by Courtney Love & Linda Perry

Zeplin Song written by Courtney Love, Linda Perry & Samantha Maloney (ASCAP, 2006)

Courtney Love - Mono - Single
 02. Fly
 03. Mono (Alternate Version)
Track 2 written by Courtney Love, Linda Perry, Patty Schemel & Jerry Best
Track 3 written by Courtney Love, Linda Perry, Patty Schemel & Larry Schemel

Britney Spears - In The Zone (DVD): Europe Bonus CD Features
 02. Girls & Boys
Written by Linda Perry
Produced by Linda Perry

L.P. - Suburban Sprawl & Alcohol
 02. The Darkside
Written by Laura Pergolizzi & Linda Perry

Gwen Stefani - Love. Angel. Music. Baby.
 01. What You Waiting For?
 09. The Real Thing
 11. Danger Zone
Tracks 1 & 9 written by Gwen Stefani & Linda Perry
Track 11 written by Gwen Stefani, Dallas Austin & Linda Perry
Track 1 co-produced by Linda Perry (uncredited)
Guitars & keyboards on track 1 engineered by Linda Perry

Joan Jett & The Blackhearts - Naked
 05. Right In The Middle
Written by Joan Jett, Linda Perry & Kenny Laguna

James Blunt - Back To Bedlam
 10. No Bravery
Produced by Linda Perry

2005

Unwritten Law - Here's To The Mourning
 06. Save Me (Wakeup Call)
Written by Scott Russo, Linda Perry & Aimee Allen
Produced by Linda Perry & Sean Beavan

Lisa Marie Presley - Now What
 01. I'll Figure It Out
 03. Thanx
 04. Shine (featuring Pink (singer))
 07. Idiot
 08. High Enough
 11. Now What
Lyrics by Lisa Marie Presley; music by Lisa Marie Presley & Linda Perry

Fischerspooner - Odyssey
 04. A Kick In The Teeth
 09. Happy (featuring Linda Perry)
 11. All We Are
Track 4 written by Linda Perry, Warren Fischer & Casey Spooner
Tracks 9 & 11 written by Linda Perry, Nicolas Vernhes, Warren Fischer & Casey Spooner

Kelly Osbourne - Sleeping In The Nothing
 01. One Word
 02. Uh Oh
 03. Redlight
 04. Secret Lover
 05. I Can't Wait
 06. Edge Of Your Atmosphere
 07. Suburbia
 08. Don't Touch Me While I'm Sleeping
 09. Save Me
 10. Entropy
Tracks 1, 2, 3, 5, 8 & 10 written by Linda Perry
Tracks 4, 6, 7 & 9 written by Linda Perry & Kelly Osbourne
Produced by Linda Perry

One Word written by Billy Currie, Christopher Payne & Midge Ure (ASCAP)
Secret Lover written by Leslie Bricusse, Anthony Newley, Linda Perry & Kelly Osbourne (ASCAP)

Juliette & The Licks - ...Like A Bolt Of Lightning
 02. Comin' Around
 06. I Am My Fathers Daughter (Non-US Bonus Track)
Written by Juliette Lewis & Linda Perry

Goapele - Change It All
 14. Darker Side Of The Moon
Written by Linda Perry & Goapele Mohlabane
Produced by Linda Perry

2006

Skin - Fake Chemical State
 07. Nothing But
Produced by Linda Perry

Dixie Chicks - Taking The Long Way
 10. Voice Inside My Head
Written by Natalie Maines, Martie Maguire, Linda Perry, Emily Robison & Dan Wilson

Cheap Trick - Rockford
 02. Perfect Stranger
Written by Robin Zander, Bun E. Carlos, Rick Nielsen, Linda Perry, Tom Petersson
Produced by Linda Perry

Joan Jett & The Blackhearts - Sinner
 01. Riddles
Written by Joan Jett, Linda Perry & Kenny Laguna

Sierra Swan - Ladyland
 01. Copper Red
 03. Get Down To It (featuring Aimee Mann)
 05. The Ladder
 06. Ladyland
 07. Trouble Is
 09. Shakedown
 10. Just Tell Me
Tracks 1, 9 & 10 written by Sierra Swan& Linda Perry
Track 5 written by Linda Perry
Tracks 3, 5, 6, 7, 9 & 10 produced by Linda Perry

Joanna - This Crazy Life
 12. Miracle
Written by Linda Perry
Produced by Linda Perry

Christina Aguilera - Back To Basics (CD 2)
 01. Enter The Circus (performed by Linda Perry)
 02. Welcome
 03. Candyman
 04. Nasty Naughty Boy
 05. I Got Trouble
 06. Hurt
 07. Mercy On Me
 08. Save Me From Myself
 09. The Right Man
Tracks 1, 3, 4, 5, 7 & 9 written by Christina Aguilera & Linda Perry
Track 2 written by Christina Aguilera, Linda Perry, Mark Ronson & Paul Ill
Track 6 written by Christina Aguilera, Linda Perry & Mark Ronson
Track 8 written by Christina Aguilera, Linda Perry & Bill Bottrell
Produced by Linda Perry

Christina Aguilera - Da Da Da (appeared in Pepsi commercials)
 Da Da Da
 Da Da Da (featuring Rain)
 Da Da Da (featuring Elissa)
Produced & recorded by Linda Perry

The Format - Dog Problems
 08. Dead End
Written by Linda Perry, Nate Ruess & Sam Means

Gwen Stefani - The Sweet Escape
 12. Wonderful Life
Written by Gwen Stefani & Linda Perry

Sierra Swan - It's A Merry Time - Digital Single
 01. It's A Merry Time
Written by Linda Perry
Produced by Linda Perry

2007

Various Artists - Make Some Noise / Instant Karma: The Amnesty International Campaign to Save Darfur (CD 1)
 03. Christina Aguilera - Mother
Mixed, engineered & produced by Linda Perry

Ben Jelen - Ex-Sensitive
 01. Pulse
 02. Where Do We Go
 03. Ex-sensitive
 04. Counting Down
 05. Just A Little
 06. Not My Plan
 07. Papa, Here I Go
 08. Vulnerable
 09. Mr. Philosopher
 10. Short Of The World
 11. Wreckage
 12. Other Side
 13. What Have We Done
Tracks 1, 2 & 9 written by Ben Jelen & Linda Perry
Track 4 written by Ben Jelen, Matt Scannell & Linda Perry
Tracks 5 & 6 written by Linda Perry
Produced & engineered by Linda Perry

The Section Quartet - Fuzzbox
 01. Juicebox
 02. No One Knows
 03. Such Great Heights
 04. Time Is Running Out
 06. Paranoid Android
 07. The Man Who Sold the World
 08. Black Hole Sun
 09. Heartbreaker
 10. The Nurse Who Loved Me
Produced & engineered by Linda Perry

Jamie Scott & The Town - Park Bench Theories
 04. Changes
Written by Jamie Scott & Linda Perry

Gina Gershon - In Search Of Cleo
 01. Watch Over Me
 05. Marie
 07. La Di Da (Sunday Morning)
 10. Fountain Of Ladies
Track 1 written by Linda Perry
Track 7 written by Gina Gershon & Linda Perry
Tracks 7 & 10 produced, mixed & engineered by Linda Perry
Track 5 engineered by Linda Perry

Vanessa Carlton - Heroes & Thieves
 03. Spring Street
 06. The One (with Stevie Nicks)
 08. This Time
Tracks 3 & 8 written by Vanessa Carlton & Linda Perry
Track 6 written by Vanessa Carlton, Linda Perry & Stephan Jenkins
Tracks 3 & 8 produced & engineered by Linda Perry

Alicia Keys - As I Am
 03. Superwoman
 08. The Thing About Love
 14. Sure Looks Good To Me
Track 3 written by Alicia Keys, Linda Perry, Steve Mostyn and Michael Jordan (Bauer)Track 8 & 14 written by Alicia Keys & Linda Perry
Tracks 8 & 14 produced by Alicia Keys & Linda Perry

Celine Dion - Taking Chances
 04. My Love
 08. New Dawn
Written by Linda Perry
Produced & engineered by Linda Perry

The Format - B-Sides & Rarities
 09. Dead End (Demo) (different from the original version)
Written by Sam Means, Linda Perry & Nate Ruess
Recorded by Linda Perry

2008

Ben Jelen - Wreckage EP - Digital only
 02. A Balance (Exclusive B-Side)
Produced & engineered by Linda Perry

Sierra Swan - Queen Of The Valley
 11. Obvious Day
Written by Sierra Swan & Linda Perry
Produced by Linda Perry

Gavin Rossdale - Wanderlust
 03. Forever May You Run
Written by Gavin Rossdale & Linda Perry

Christina Aguilera - Keeps Gettin' Better
 01. Keeps Gettin' Better
 02. Dynamite
Written by Christina Aguilera & Linda Perry
Produced & engineered by Linda Perry

Daniel Powter - Under The Radar
 01. Best Of Me
 02. Not Coming Back
 03. Whole World Around
 04. Next Plane Home
 05. Am I Still The One (featuring Linda Perry)
 06. Negative Fashion
 07. Don't Give Up On Me
 08. Fly Away
 09. Beauty Queen
 10. My So Called Life
Track 9 written by Daniel Powter & Linda Perry
Track 10 written by Linda Perry
Produced & engineered by Linda Perry

Giusy Ferreri - Gaetana
 07. La Scala (The Ladder)
 11. Cuore assente (The La La Song)
Written by Linda Perry
Italian translation by Tiziano Ferro

2009-2018

Adam Lambert - For Your Entertainment
 A Loaded Smile

Christina Aguilera - Bionic
 11. Lift Me Up

Reni Lane "Ready"
 Drive

Little Fish - Baffled & Beat
 Darling Dear
 Welcome To The Party

Alicia Keys - The Element of Freedom (Deluxe Edition)
 Pray for Forgiveness

Sierra Swan - Girl Who Cried Wolf

1. I Will Follow
2. Girl Who Cried Wolf
3. Who Am I
4. End of You
5. Deep Wound
6. The Truth Is...
7. Mansion Crew
8. Oh You
9. In My Room
10. Untitled
11. Blame

Hole - Nobody's Daughter

1. Nobody's Daughter 	
2. Skinny Little Bitch
3. Honey
4. Pacific Coast Highway
5. Samantha
6. Someone Else's Bed
7. For Once in Your Life
8. Letter to God
9. Loser Dust
10. How Dirty Girls Get Clean
11. Never Go Hungry
12. Happy Ending Story
13. Codine

Unreleased Tracks
Amen
Can You Make Me Cry
Car Crash
The Depths of My Despair
Everything I Touch
Good in Bed
How Dirty Girls Get Clean Candy Version
I See Red
In My Gutters
Last Will and Testament
Leading Man
The Light
My Bedroom Walls
Nobody's Daughter Original Version
Number One Genius
Pretty Your Whole Life
Sad But True
Stand Up Motherfucker
Sunset Marquis
Too Much Dope"
Wildfire

KT Tunstall - Tiger Suit
10. Madame Trudeaux (written by Tunstall and Linda Perry)

Weezer - Hurley
09. Brave New World (written by Rivers Cuomo and Linda Perry)

Hemming - Hemming
2015
1. Hard On Myself
2. I'll Never Be The Man For You
3. Some Of My Friends
4. Pins and Needles
5. Paper Crane
6. Home
7. Vitamins
8. Give It Away
9. Said and Done
10. Gone

Miley Cyrus - Freeheld Soundtrack
2015
1. Hands Of Love

Adele - 25
2015 Target Bonus Track
12. Can't Let Go

Lea Michele - Places
2017
9. Sentimental Memories

Dolly Parton - Dumplin'
2018
 3. "Girl in the Movies"
 4. "Red Shoes"
 8. "Who"
 9. "Push and Pull"
 10. "If We Don't"

References

Production discographies
Pop music discographies
Rock music discographies